For the state pageant affiliated with Miss Teen USA, see Miss Massachusetts Teen USA

The Miss Massachusetts' Outstanding Teen competition is the pageant that selects the representative for the U.S. state of Massachusetts in the Miss America's Outstanding Teen pageant.

Jenna McLaughlin of Medford was crowned Miss Massachusetts' Outstanding Teen on April 10th, 2022 at White’s of Westford in Westford, Massachusetts. She competed at Miss America's Outstanding Teen 2023 at the Hyatt Regency Dallas in Dallas, Texas on August 12, 2022 where she was a Teens in Action finalist.

Results summary 

The year in parentheses indicates year of Miss America's Outstanding Teen competition the award/placement was garnered.

Placements 
 Top 10: Chelsea Marie Leclerc (2007)

Awards

Non-finalist awards 
 Non-finalist Talent: Alyssa Maitoza (2017)

Other awards 
 Children's Miracle Network (CMN) Miracle Maker Award: Carly Fisher (2018)
 Outstanding Dance Talent Award: Alyssa Maitoza (2017)
 Teens in Action Finalists: Amy de Silva (2012), Rachel Michelle-Marie Perry (2020), Jenna McLaughlin (2023)

Winners

References

External links
 Official website

Massachusetts
Massachusetts culture
Women in Massachusetts
Annual events in Massachusetts